Rohan Anthony Ricketts (born 22 December 1982) is an English professional footballer who most recently played as an attacking midfielder for Master's Futbol of League1 Ontario.

Club career

Arsenal
Ricketts started out with Arsenal, with whom he won the FA Youth Cup in 2000 and 2001. He made one appearance for them, in the League Cup, against Manchester United.

Tottenham Hotspur
In 2002, he made the unusual step of joining Arsenal's rivals Tottenham Hotspur, and became just the fourth player to make the switch from Arsenal to Tottenham Hotspur and only the twelfth to appear for both sides since their formation.

Ricketts did not play a single game in his first season, but was a first-team regular in 2003–04 and his form saw him agree a one-year contract extension with the club in December 2003. Tord Grip was impressed with his ability and there was talk of him being called up to the senior England squad , but following on from Glenn Hoddle's sacking as Tottenham manager, Ricketts found his first team opportunities limited, despite being named Player of the Month in August and September for Tottenham. He scored one league goal during his time at Spurs, in a 2–1 win over Aston Villa in November 2003. He also scored once in the League Cup for Spurs, in a game against Coventry City.

Loan spells
The following season, under Jacques Santini and then Martin Jol, he found appearances harder to come by and had two loan spells, first at Coventry City, and then Wolverhampton Wanderers, linking up with his former manager, Glenn Hoddle. He scored once for Wolves, in a 2–1 win over Reading on 30 April 2005.

Wolves & Barnsley
In the summer of 2005 he moved to Molineux on a permanent basis. He had a loan spell at Queens Park Rangers in 2007 and was released by Wolves in May of the same year.

Ricketts signed a two-year deal with Championship side Barnsley in July 2007 but was released on 11 April 2008. That same day he was signed by Toronto FC of Major League Soccer.

Toronto FC
Rohan Ricketts scored his first two goals for Toronto FC against the Colorado Rapids on 14 June 2008. In 2008 Ricketts made 26 starts (27 total appearances) and scored four goals in the regular season; he added two more goals in the Canadian Championship.

In 2009, Ricketts was pushed down Toronto FC's depth chart due to the arrivals of Canadian international Dwayne DeRosario and young American Sam Cronin; in June, Toronto released Ricketts, clearing the salary cap space necessary for the club to sign Canadian international Ali Gerba.

Following his release from Toronto, Ricketts reportedly spurned interest from several English clubs to go on trial with Aberdeen in August 2009. Ricketts reportedly impressed during his trialin particular in Aberdeen's 1–0 win over Hull City in a preseason friendly matchbut budgetary constraints reportedly complicated the potential signing, and Ricketts ultimately did not remain with the club.

Later career
In early 2010 during the winter transfer market in Europe, Ricketts signed for Hungarian club Diósgyőri VTK. He made one first-team appearance as the club were relegated from Hungary's top professional league to the NB2. In August 2010 Ricketts signed for FC Dacia Chişinău of the Moldovan National Division. He made his debut the same month in a 0–0 draw against FC Academia UTM Chişinău.He left the club three months later, claiming he had not been paid.

Ricketts signed for German club SV Wilhelmshaven in January 2011, but left the club at the end of the 2010–11 season. He went on trial at two English clubs,  Southend United and Stevenage, but did not sign for either. Instead  Ricketts signed for League of Ireland champions Shamrock Rovers in August 2011. He made his first team debut away to Dundalk on 3 September and was involved in both goals, providing the cross for the first goal and the pass to win a penalty for the second goal in a 2–1 win. Ricketts played in the UEFA Europa League in a 3–1 defeat against former club Tottenham Hotspur. He was released from Shamrock Rovers in December 2011, after not being offered a new contract.

In March 2012, Ricketts sign a one-season contract with League One side Exeter City, but left the club before the end of the season after just one substitute appearance. Ricketts signed for defending I-League champions Dempo in August 2012. He announced on Twitter in January 2013 that he had resigned from Dempo, after he was suspended by the club for an outburst on Twitter. The same month he signed for Ecuadorian team Club Deportivo Quevedo, and made his debut for the club in a 1 – 1 draw against reigning champions Barcelona. His contract was terminated at the end of July 2013 after making 9 appearances for the club.

Ricketts signed for PTT Rayong of the Thai Premier League in January 2014, but his contract was terminated by mutual agreement 9 months later. In January 2015 he signed for Hong Kong Premier League side Eastern Sports Club. He then joined Bangladesh Premier League club Abahani Limited Dhaka in March 2016, returned to England to play for  Leatherhead in November 2016, before leaving the club a month later .

Ahead of the 2018 League1 Ontario season, it was announced that Ricketts had returned to Canada to play for Master's Futbol. He did not return for the 2019 season.

International career
Ricketts was capped by England at under-18 and under-20 level.

Personal life
During the 2010 FIFA World Cup, Ricketts co-hosted 'The Hardcore Footy Show: South Africa 2010' with Brendan Dunlop, on Hardcore Sports Radio, Sirius 98 and was a regular on TSN for football. On 24 August 2010, Rohan joined the team of Canada's largest sportsradio network, CJCL, (Fan 590). He is currently a sports columnist with them. He also signed to write for online magazine, the Sabotage Times, on 29 August.

In May 2011, Ricketts launched his own online-only magazine, Column 10. The magazine, which includes a host of features on sport, music, film, fashion and more, has included exclusive interviews with football journalist Henry Winter, official FIFA Agent Charles Collymore and DJ Spoony.

Ricketts had been a regular guest on World Football Daily offering insights and entertaining football talk to fans in America.

Career statistics

Honours
Arsenal
FA Youth Cup: 2000, 2001

Toronto FC
Canadian Championship: 2009

Shamrock Rovers
League of Ireland: 2011

Eastern Sports Club
Hong Kong Senior Shield: 2014–15

Individual
 Canadian Championship Golden Boot: 2008 (co-winner – two goals)

References

External links

 
 Rohan Ricketts' website
 
 ESPN Soccernet profile

1982 births
Living people
Footballers from Clapham
Black British sportsmen
English footballers
Association football midfielders
Premier League players
Arsenal F.C. players
Tottenham Hotspur F.C. players
Coventry City F.C. players
Wolverhampton Wanderers F.C. players
Queens Park Rangers F.C. players
Barnsley F.C. players
Major League Soccer players
Toronto FC players
Nemzeti Bajnokság I players
Diósgyőri VTK players
Moldovan Super Liga players
FC Dacia Chișinău players
Regionalliga players
SV Wilhelmshaven players
League of Ireland players
Shamrock Rovers F.C. players
English Football League players
Exeter City F.C. players
I-League players
Dempo SC players
Ecuadorian Serie A players
C.D. Quevedo footballers
Hong Kong Premier League players
Rohan Ricketts
Rohan Ricketts
Eastern Sports Club footballers
Bangladesh Premier League players
Abahani Limited (Dhaka) players
English expatriate footballers
Expatriate soccer players in Canada
English expatriate sportspeople in Canada
Expatriate footballers in Hungary
English expatriate sportspeople in Hungary
Expatriate footballers in Moldova
English expatriate sportspeople in Moldova
Expatriate footballers in Germany
English expatriate sportspeople in Germany
Expatriate association footballers in Ireland
English expatriate sportspeople in Ireland
Expatriate footballers in India
English expatriate sportspeople in India
Expatriate footballers in Ecuador
English expatriate sportspeople in Ecuador
Expatriate footballers in Thailand
English expatriate sportspeople in Thailand
Expatriate footballers in Hong Kong
English expatriate sportspeople in Hong Kong
Expatriate footballers in Bangladesh
English expatriate sportspeople in Bangladesh
Master's FA players